The Botswana Meat Industry Workers' Union (BMIWU) is a trade union affiliate of the Botswana Federation of Trade Unions in Botswana.

References

Botswana Federation of Trade Unions
Agriculture in Botswana
Organisations based in Lobatse
Trade unions in Botswana
Meat industry trade unions